SThree plc is an international specialist staffing organisation, founded in the United Kingdom and headquartered in London. It is listed on the London Stock Exchange and is a constituent of the FTSE 250 Index.

History
The Company was founded by Bill Bottriell and Simon Arber as a specialist recruitment business in 1986. Barclays provided development finance for the business in 1999 and it floated on the London Stock Exchange in 2005.

The Conservative politician Nadhim Zahawi MP was member of the board until October 2017.

Operations
The Company provides permanent and contract specialist staffing services in the UK and Europe, Americas and AsiaPac and MENA regions, specializing in the Information Technology, Banking & Finance, Life Sciences, Engineering, and Energy sectors. It operates under a number of different brand names, including:
 Computer Futures
 Progressive
 Real Staffing Group
 Huxley Associates

References

External links
 Official site

Employment agencies of the United Kingdom
Business services companies established in 1986
Companies based in the City of London
1986 establishments in the United Kingdom